Eyralpenus meinhofi is a polymorphic tiger-moth in the family Erebidae first described by Max Bartel in 1903. It is known from the east and central Africa: Tanzania, Zambia (Goodger, Watson, 1995, as meinhofi), Zambia, Angola, Zaire (Goodger, Watson, 1995, as metaxantha); Malawi (Goodger, Watson, 1995 and Dubatolov, 2009, as melanocera); Zaire (Kiriakoff, 1965, as melanocera); Zimbabwe (Dubatolov, 2011).

References
 , 2009: Reviewing the African tiger-moth genera: 1. A new genus, two new subgenera and a species list from the expedition to Malawi by V.Kovtunovich & P. Usthjuzhanin in 2008-2009, with further taxonomic notes on South African Arctiinae (Lepidoptera, Arctiidae: Arctiinae). Atalanta 40 (1/2): 285-301, 352-355 (colour plates 24-27).
 , 2011: Arctiinae from African expeditions of V. Kovtunovich & P. Ustjuzhanin in 2009-2011, with description of new taxa and taxonomic notes (Lepidoptera, Arctiidae). Atalanta 42 (1/2): 125-135.
 , 1995: The Afrotropical Tiger-Moths. An illustrated catalogue, with generic diagnosis and species distribution, of the Afrotropical Arctiinae (Lepidoptera: Arctiidae). – Stenstrup, Denmark: Apollo Books Aps., 55 pp.
 , 1965: Les Lépidoptères h”etérocères africaines de la collection Abel Dufrane. Bulletin Institute royal des Sciences naturelles de Belgique 41 (21): 1-17.

Spilosomina
Insects of Tanzania
Fauna of Zambia
Moths of Africa
Moths described in 1903